Edward Weil (April 12, 1872 – March 4, 1932) was a Jewish-American lawyer, politician, and judge from New York.

Life 
Weil was born on April 12, 1872 in New York City, New York. His father was Isaac Weil, a German immigrant and garment worker.

Weil attended Grammar School No. 15 and the old Fifth Street school. He then went to the New York University School of Law, graduating from there with an LL.B. in 1893. He was admitted to the bar in 1898 and developed an extensive law practice in New York City. He initially had a private practice in Harlem, later practicing in Yorkville.

In 1910, Weil was elected to the New York State Assembly as a Democrat, representing the New York County 22nd District. He served in the Assembly in 1911, 1912, and 1913. He lost the 1913 re-election to Republican Benjamin E. Moore. He worked as Assistant District Attorney from 1916 to 1922, first under Edward Swann and then under Joab H. Banton. In 1922, Mayor John F. Hylan appointed him Magistrate to fill a vacancy caused by the death of Magistrate Raphael Tobias. At the end of the three-year term, he was reappointed Magistrate for a full ten-year term.

Weil was president of the Harlem Old Timers, Past Regent of the Manhattan Council of the Royal Arcanum, and a member of the Grand Street Boys Association, the Elks, the Tribe of Ben-Hur, and the Freemasons. His wife died in 1927, and his children were Robert and Joseph Edward.

Weil died at home from a cardiac attack on March 4, 1932. His funeral took place in the Free Synagogue, with Rabbi Louis I. Newman delivering the eulogy. The pallbearers were members of the Harlem Old Timers Club (which he headed for many years), and his funeral was attended by (among other people) Surrogate John P. O'Brien and a number of magistrates and judges. He was buried in Mount Neboh Cemetery.

References

External links 

 The Political Graveyard

1872 births
1932 deaths
American people of German-Jewish descent
New York University School of Law alumni
19th-century American lawyers
20th-century American lawyers
Lawyers from New York City
People from Harlem
People from Yorkville, Manhattan
19th-century American Jews
20th-century American Jews
Jewish American attorneys
Jewish American state legislators in New York (state)
20th-century American politicians
Politicians from Manhattan
Democratic Party members of the New York State Assembly
20th-century American judges
New York (state) state court judges
American Freemasons
Burials in New York (state)